Shaheed Bhagat Singh International Airport  is a civil enclave customs airport serving the city of Chandigarh, India. The airport is located in the village of Jhiurheri in the Mohali district of Punjab, India. The airport caters to six domestic airlines and connects Chandigarh to 17 domestic destinations and 2 international destinations. The airport was awarded as the 'Best Airport by Hygiene Measures' in Asia-Pacific in 2021, by Airports Council International.

History
Chandigarh Airport operated all its civil and commercial operations from the civil enclave of the Indian Air Force Station. Indian Airlines started operating flights from Chandigarh to Delhi in the 1970s. A new airport building was constructed in the civil enclave and was opened on 14 April 2011. This air terminal was declared a customs airport on 19 August 2011, making it eligible for a limited number of international flights, but no international flight ever operated from this terminal.

The Government of Punjab through GMADA and the Government of Haryana through HUDA each have a 24.5% stake and the Airports Authority of India holds the rest, a 51% stake in CHIAL the operator of the airport.

On 24 December 2015, the Mohali Industries Association filed a public interest litigation (PIL) in the Punjab and Haryana High Court for non-operation of international flights after spending  on the airport. After numerous hearings at Punjab and Haryana High Court and a long wait, IndiGo and Air India Express commenced flights to Dubai and Sharjah respectively in September 2016.

Facilities

Terminal

The new terminal was inaugurated by Prime Minister Narendra Modi on 11 September 2015. This new eco-friendly terminal is one of its kind in India and was built by Larsen and Toubro. The interior of the airport has plants, for a feeling of a botanical garden. It is located at the village of Jhiurheri in Punjab and became operational on 19 October 2015.

Construction of the new terminal included two link taxiways to the terminal and cargo complex. A 900m taxiway was added in April 2022 increasing the capacity to 20 aircraft per hour. The terminal has five aerobridges apron for parking five in contact and eight remote parking stands for aircraft. The departures are on the first floor and arrivals on the ground floor. The first phase of the terminal covering 53,000 sq metres has a capacity of 1,600 passengers at a time and a parking space for 150 vehicles. This is not a greenfield airport but uses the runway of the present Indian air force base.

There is one ATM located in the parking area, WiFi inside the terminal, and one duty-free shop in the departures area. The airport facilities are operated by CHIAL (Chandigarh International Airport Limited).

Runway
The airport has single runway 11/29. From 2017 to 2019, the runway went through a major upgrade and repair that was completed on 9 April 2019. , the airport is available for 24 hour operations. Additional runway approach lighting in the touchdown zone was installed in 2021 to assist in landing during foggy weather. As of 2022, runway is 10,400 ft Code 4E and equipped with 900 AFLS, 02 ILS, CAT I ILS at Rwy 11 and CAT-II at Rwy 29 making IXC capable to handle wide-bodied aircraft.

Cargo terminal
An integrated common use cargo terminal to handle domestic, international including perishable goods is planned. The cargo terminal will include five buildings of  each, with one building designated for perishable goods.

Airlines and destinations

Statistics

See also
 List of airports in India

References

External links

Chandigarh Airport - Airport Authority of India

Airports in Chandigarh
Buildings and structures in Chandigarh
Transport in Chandigarh
1970s establishments in Chandigarh
Year of establishment missing
Airports established in the 1970s
International airports in India
20th-century architecture in India